Ultra Records is an American record label formed in New York City in 1995 by former PolyGram and Virgin Records executive Patrick Moxey. As of December 23, 2012, Ultra entered a global partnership with Sony Music, giving its artists access to Sony's international marketing and promotional resources.

Ultra Records' roster includes Sofi Tukker, Kygo, Steve Aoki, Mr. Probz, DVBBS, Shaun Frank, Era Istrefi, Deorro, Flosstradamus, Carnage, Louis the Child, Alina Baraz & Galimatias, Lost Frequencies, Tep No, Benny Benassi, Mako, Klingande, Giiants, Iceleak, Stela Cole & Headhunterz. Ultra has featured releases from deadmau5, Alan Walker, Calvin Harris, Tiësto, Kaskade, Above & Beyond, Armin van Buuren, Sak Noel, Paul Oakenfold, Avicii, David Guetta, Pitbull, The Crystal Method, The Bloody Beetroots, Sasha, John Digweed, and Virginia to Vegas.

Awards
Ultra Music has received a Grammys for Benny Benassi's remix of Public Enemy's “Bring The Noise” (2008) and Skrillex’s remix of Benny Benassi's "Cinema" (2012), as well as being nominated in 2017 for Best Dance Recording with Sofi Tukker's “Drinkee,” Best Dance Electronic Album with Jean-Michel Jarre's “Electronic 1: The Time Machine”, and Best Music Film with Steve Aoki’s “I’ll Sleep When I’m Dead”. Ultra Music has also won the title of International Dance Music Awards' Best American Music Label 10 consecutive times.

Certifications
By 2017, Ultra Records (then Ultra Music) had received Diamond, Platinum, and Gold records worldwide.
 OMI's "Cheerleader" (Felix Jaehn Remix) has received 1× Diamond, 20× Platinum, and 7× Gold certifications globally.
 Steve Aoki and member of One Direction, Louis Tomlinson, released their collaboration “Just Hold On,” which went Gold and Silver in 6 countries in four months.
 “Don’t Be So Shy (Filatov & Karas Remix)” by French singer and model Imany went 2× Platinum.
 Producer and DJ Deorro’s Latin crossover ballad “Bailar”, featuring Grammy Award-winning Merengue singer Elvis Crespo went multi-Platinum and Gold.
 Deorro's collaboration with Chris Brown “Five More Hours” earned 19× Platinum and 4× Gold certifications.
 “Paradise,” a collaboration between Benny Benassi and Chris Brown went certified Gold in 2016.
 Jesper Jenset's singles released on the label in partnership with Sony Music Norway "High" and "Painkiller" have become 2× Platinum and Gold in Norway, respectively.
Recent signings to the Ultra repertoire have acquired some charted titles:
 Lost Frequencies’ “Are You With Me” with multi-Platinum and Gold certifications across 14 countries.
 Pop singer Era Istrefi’s track “BonBon” went Gold in 4 countries.
 SNBRN’s “Gangsta Walk” went 2× Platinum.
 French producer Klingande went Platinum with his song “Somewhere New”.
 Grammy-nominated duo Sofi Tukker went certified Gold with their record “Drinkee”.
 Ultra's artist Kygo performed the Closing Ceremony of Rio's 2016 Olympics.

Synchs
Ultra Records releases are featured in films, television programs, video games, film trailers, and advertisements, including the following in 2016:
 Far East Movement - Get Up (Rattle) - The Secret Life Of Pets trailer
 Steve Aoki feat. Kid Ink - Delirious (Boneless) - War Dogs trailer
 Ludacris - Get Back - Smurfs 3 Trailer
 Kanye West - I Am A God - Assassin's Creed trailer
 Deorro feat. Elvis Crespo - Bailar - Just Dance 2017
 Dyro & Dannic - Raddical - Just Dance 2017
 Era Istrefi - BonBon - Just Dance 2017
 Flosstradamus, FKI 1st, & graves - Came Up feat. Post Malone & key! - Madden NFL ‘17
 Steve Aoki & Laidback Luke feat. Lil Jon - Turbulence - Madden NFL ‘17
 Steve Aoki - How Else feat. Rich The Kid and ILoveMakonennen - Madden NFL ‘17
 Kygo feat. Kodaline - Raging - FIFA 2017
 Neil Ormandy - Shoulders Of Giants - Lucifer Promo Campaign
 Anderson .Paak feat. ScHoolboy Q - SONOS In-Store POS Campaign
 Daktyl - Stay - Samsung Come Together Ad
 Busy Signal - Watch Me Now - Smirnoff’s Diageo Ad
 Deorro - Move On - T-Mobile Ad
 Flosstradamus feat. Travis Porter - Drop Top (Party Favor & Meaux Green Remix) - T-Mobile Ad
 Vic Mensa - U Mad - Apple Watch Ad
 Busy Signal - Everybody Move - LG Ad
 Deorro feat. Elvis Crespo - Bailar - Target Fall 2016 Ad
 Deorro feat. Elvis Crespo - Bailar - Target Halloween 2016 Ad
 Anderson .Paak feat. ScHoolboy Q - Am I Wrong - Google Pixel “Low-Light Bikers” TV Ad

Partnerships
 Ultra Records has produced a series of long concert movies, including Steve Aoki’s Grammy-nominated I'll Sleep When I'm Dead (2016) documentary, as well as Kygo and Deorro's forthcoming concert documentaries.
 Ultra Music Festival and Ultra Records have partnered with one another to create a series of electronic music festivals worldwide.

Compilations
Dance music compilations that have come out on Ultra Records:

Club Anthems
Club Anthems Vol. 1 - Denny Tsettos (September 7, 2004)
Club Anthems Vol. 2 - Bad Boy Joe (March 8, 2005)
Club Anthems Vol. 3 - The Riddler (March 7, 2006)
Ultra.Chilled
Ultra.Chilled 01 - (November 27, 2001)
Ultra.Chilled 02 - (April 30, 2002)
Ultra.Chilled 03 - (October 29, 2002)
Ultra.Chilled 04 - (July 29, 2003)
Ultra.Chilled 05 - David Waxman (March 22, 2005)
Ultra.Chilled 06 - (November 17, 2009)
Ultra Chilled 2016 - (May 27, 2016)
Ultra Electro
Ultra Electro - David Waxman (April 4, 2006)
Ultra Electro 2 - David Waxman (August 21, 2007)
Ultra Electro 3 - David Waxman (December 9, 2009)
Ultra.Summer 01-02
Ultra.Dance 01 - 18
Ultra.Dance 01 - Johnny Vicious (January 22, 2002)
Ultra.Dance 02 - DJ Encore (June 25, 2002)
Ultra.Dance 03 - Johnny Vicious (February 25, 2003)
Ultra.Dance 04 - Louie DeVito (August 26, 2003)
Ultra.Dance 05 - Vic Latino & David Waxman (April 20, 2004)
Ultra.Dance 06 - The Riddler & Vic Latino (January 25, 2005)
Ultra.Dance 07 - Bad Boy Joe & Johnny Budz (January 24, 2006)
Ultra.Dance 08 - The Riddler & Trevor Simpson (January 23, 2007)
Ultra.Dance 09 - David Waxman (January 22, 2008)
Ultra.Dance 10 - Jason Nevins (January 6, 2009)
Ultra.Dance 11 - DJ Enferno (January 26, 2010)
Ultra.Dance 12 - Vic Latino (January 25, 2011)
Ultra.Dance 13 (February 7, 2012)
Ultra.Dance 14 (February 12, 2013)
Ultra.Dance 15 - Jump Smokers (January 21, 2014)
Ultra.Dance 16 (February 24, 2015)
Ultra.Dance 17 (January 29, 2016)
Ultra.Dance 18 (January 27, 2017)
Ultra.Dance 19 (January 26, 2018)
Ultra.Dance 20 (February 15, 2019)
Ultra.Dance 21 (February 21, 2020)
Ultra.Dance 22 (February 19, 2021)
Ultra.Trance 1 - 10
Ultra.Trance:1 - David Waxman (October 2, 2002)
Ultra.Trance:2 - David Waxman (May 20, 2003)
Ultra.Trance:3 - Johnny Vicious (January 27, 2004)
Ultra.Trance:4 - (September 7, 2004)
Ultra.Trance:5 - The Riddler (September 20, 2005)
Ultra.Trance 06 - Johnny Budz & DJ Irene (September 26, 2006)
Ultra.Trance 07 - DJ 4 Strings (October 9, 2007)
Ultra.Trance 08 - (April 22, 2008)
Ultra.Trance 09 - (April 21, 2009)
Ultra.Trance 10 - (April 3, 2012)
Out.Anthems Vol. 1 - 8 (the first gay-themed musical compilation).
Out.Anthems - (May 30, 2006)
Out.Anthems 2 - DJ Ricardo! (May 22, 2007)
Out.Anthems 3 - DJ Ricardo! (May 20, 2008)
Out Anthems 4 - DJ Ricardo! (July 28, 2009)
Out Anthems 5 - DJ Ricardo! (June 22, 2010)
Out Anthems 6 - DJ Ricardo! (June 28, 2011)
Out Anthems 7 - DJ Ricardo! (June 19, 2012)
Out Anthems 8 - DJ Ricardo! (June 11, 2013)
Ultra.80's vs Electro 1
Ultra.Club Classics: '90s 1
Ultra.Video (DVD) 1 - 2
Ultra.Weekend 1 - 9
Ultra.Rock Remixed
Ultra.2008
Ultra.2009
Ultra.2010
Ultra.2011
Ultra.2012
Ultra.2013
Ultra.2014
Ultra 2015
Ultra 2016
 Ultra.10 1
 Ultra Deep House 1
Ultra Dubstep 1
Ultra Trap 1
Ultra Hits 1 - 2
Ultra.Mix 1 - 8
Just Dance 1 - 3
Ultra.Latino 1
The Jersey Shore 1 - 3
Electric Daisy Carnival Vol. 1 - 3
Ultra Music Festival Compilation 2013 - 2017

See also
 List of record labels

References

External links

 
Mitsui
Sony Music
American independent record labels
Electronic dance music record labels
Electronic music record labels
Record labels established in 1995
2022 mergers and acquisitions